George Landis is an American football coach. He is the defensive backs coach at Central Dauphin High School in Harrisburg, Pennsylvania. Landis served as the head football coach at Bloomsburg University of Pennsylvania from 1982 to 1985 and Bucknell University from 1986 to 1988, compiling a career college football coaching record of 34–37–2. He was also the head baseball coach at Dartmouth College for one season, in 1981, tallying a mark of 7–24. Landis played college football at Pennsylvania State University.

Head coaching record

College football

References

Year of birth missing (living people)
Living people
American football defensive backs
Bloomsburg Huskies football coaches
Bucknell Bison football coaches
Cornell Big Red football coaches
Dartmouth Big Green baseball coaches
Dartmouth Big Green football coaches
Penn State Nittany Lions football coaches
Penn State Nittany Lions football players
Penn Quakers football coaches
UConn Huskies football coaches
Villanova Wildcats football coaches
High school football coaches in New Jersey
High school football coaches in Pennsylvania
People from Linwood, New Jersey
Players of American football from New Jersey